Gölles is a surname. Notable people with the surname include:

Julian Gölles (born 1999), Austrian footballer 
Stefan Gölles (born 1991), Austrian footballer